Blumenhagen station is a railway station in the municipality of Blumenhagen, located in the Vorpommern-Greifswald district in Mecklenburg-Vorpommern, Germany.

References

Railway stations in Mecklenburg-Western Pomerania
Buildings and structures in Vorpommern-Greifswald